The Great Wall: Original Motion Picture Soundtrack is the soundtrack to the film of the same name. This music is composed by Ramin Djawadi and released on December 16, 2016, in China. The soundtrack was released on February 17, 2017, worldwide. The Vinyl version is expected to drop later in March 2017. Ramin Djawadi in composing the score, Djawadi wanted to echo the film's bridging of eastern and western culture by combining a big Hollywood symphony orchestra with iconic Chinese solo instruments. It gives the score a lot of different colors, variety of themes. Brandon Campbell provided additional music for the film.

Track listing
All music by Ramin Djawadi, except where noted.

References

2016 soundtrack albums
Ramin Djawadi soundtracks
Action film soundtracks